Mammillaria geminispina, the twin spined cactus, is a species of flowering plant in the family Cactaceae, native to central Mexico. The clustering spherical stems, 8 cm in diameter, are covered in white down and white spines. Carmine pink flowers are borne in summer and autumn.

Its status is listed as “Least concern ” by the IUCN Red List.

Cultivation
Mammillaria geminispina is one of several Mammillaria species to be cultivated. In temperate regions it must be grown under glass with heat. It has gained the Royal Horticultural Society's Award of Garden Merit.

References

geminispina
Cacti of Mexico
Endemic flora of Mexico
Flora of Hidalgo (state)
Flora of Querétaro
Flora of San Luis Potosí